Tótem was an Uruguayan rock band formed in the early 1970s. One of the most important massive phenomena of Uruguayan music and represented the height of the Candombe beat.

Band members
1971
Ruben Rada (lead voice and percussion)
Eduardo Useta (guitar)
Enrique Rey (†1995)(guitar)
Mario “Chichito” Cabral (percussion)
Daniel “Lobito” Lagarde (bass)
Roberto Galletti († 2009) (drums)

(drums1972
Santiago Ameijenda replace Galletti in drums.

1973
Eduardo Useta  (guitar and voice)
Enrique Rey (guitar and voice)
Mario “Chichito” Cabral (percussion)
Roberto Giordano (bas)
Santiago Ameijenda (drums)
Tomás “Chocho” Paolini (saxophone)

Discography

Simples 
1971
A-side - Dedos

B-side - Biafra

1972
A-side - Mi Pueblo

B-side - Negro

Long Plays
1971 - Totem
A-side
 - Dedos
 - Chévere
 - De Este Cielo Santo
 - Días De Esos
 - Todos
B-side
 - Biafra
 - El Tábano
 - Mañana
 - No Me Molestes
 - La Lluvia Cae Para Todos Igual

1972 - Descarga
A-side
 - Heloísa
 - Orejas
 - Manos
 - Pacífico
 - Todo Mal
B-side
 - Negro
 - Mi Alcoba
 - Un Sueño Para Gonzalo (instrumental)
 - Descarga

1973 - Corrupción

A-side
 - Nena
 - Toda América
 - A Victoria y Federico
 - Hola Hermano
 - Congueiro
B-side
 - Corrupción
 - El Hombre Feliz
 - Cáspita

See also
Ruben Rada
Uruguayan rock
Candombe

Uruguayan rock music groups
Musical groups established in 1971
1971 establishments in Uruguay